This list is of the Cultural Properties of Japan designated in the category of  for the Prefecture of Okinawa.

National Cultural Properties
As of 1 January 2015, two Important Cultural Properties have been designated, being of national significance.

Prefectural Cultural Properties
As of 1 May 2014, two properties have been designated at a prefectural level.

Municipal Cultural Properties
As of 1 May 2014, one property has been designated at a municipal level.

See also
 Cultural Properties of Japan
 List of National Treasures of Japan (archaeological materials)
 History of the Ryukyu Islands
 List of Historic Sites of Japan (Okinawa)
 List of Cultural Properties of Japan - historical materials (Okinawa)

References

External links
  Cultural Properties in Okinawa Prefecture
  List of Cultural Properties in Okinawa Prefecture

History of Okinawa Prefecture
Archaeological materials,Okinawa
Okinawa,Cultural Properties
Archaeological materials,Cultural Properties